Bob Earl (born January 13, 1950) is an American former racing driver from Claremont, California. He began racing in Formula Ford in 1972 and was the 1973 national champion. In 1979 he made his professional debut in Formula Atlantic.  In 1981 he became the only American to win the Macau Grand Prix, driving a modified Hayashi 320.  At the time, the race was contested with Formula Atlantic cars.

He moved to sports cars in 1985 and drove a Pontiac Fiero for Huffaker Racing in the IMSA GTU series for two years. He moved up to the GTP cars in 1986 driving for a prototype for Spice Engineering. Earl and the Spice team earned a class victory at the 24 Hours of Daytona in 1987. He continued with Spice in GTP class in 1988, but in 1989 moved to Roush Racing's Lincoln-Mercury effort in the GTO class, capturing class honors at Daytona. He moved to the Nissan GTP factory team in 1990 and captured victories at the 12 Hours of Sebring, Miami and Watkins Glen. He stayed with Nissan until they left the series in 1993. For the 1993 season he competed in the Camel Lights prototype class in an Acura powered Spice with 2 wins.

He retired as a competitor after the 1993 season to become a driver coach. In 1996 he was hired to start the Derek Daly Academy at Las Vegas Motor Speedway. In 2000 he returned home to the Marin County to resume freelance driver coaching. From 2002 to 2009 Bob was the Technical Director and overlooked the Mechanics Training Program at the Jim Russell Racing School at Infineon Raceway in Sonoma California.

He has also developed and sells the "Virtual Racing Chassis", an advanced racing sim for use with Racing video games.

Bob Earl continues as a freelance driver coach, lecturer on racing organization and mental training, and promotes the advantages of Alkaline Water Ionizers for improving your health. 
Bob has recently moved to Humboldt County and is involved in many Environmental activities doing Restorations of Beach Dunes, Redwood Forest trails and many others. He has become an environmentalist of sorts working to address climate change.

Racing record

SCCA National Championship Runoffs

24 Hours of Le Mans results

References

External links
Official website
Official website
Official website

1950 births
Atlantic Championship drivers
SCCA Formula Super Vee drivers
Living people
People from Claremont, California
Racing drivers from California
SCCA National Championship Runoffs winners
12 Hours of Sebring drivers
24 Hours of Le Mans drivers

Nismo drivers